Vanillerostbraten ("vanilla roast beef" in German) is an Austrian beef cutlet dish prepared with garlic, salt, pepper, butter, onions, and brown bouillon and normally served with fried potatoes.

Vanilla is not included in the recipe. When the dish was created, garlic was referred to the vanilla of the poor man (Vanille des kleinen Mannes). Hence the name.

See also
 List of beef dishes
 List of garlic dishes

References

Beef dishes
Austrian cuisine
Garlic dishes